WHUB (1400 AM) is a radio station broadcasting a News Talk Information format. Licensed to Cookeville, Tennessee, United States, the station serves the Cookeville area. The station is owned by Cookeville Communications, LLC and features programming from Citadel Media, Fox Sports Radio, and Premiere Radio Networks.

References

External links

WHUB History, Stories, and Information

HUB
News and talk radio stations in the United States
Putnam County, Tennessee
Radio stations established in 1940